Littlebeck may refer to the following places in England:

Littlebeck, Cumbria
Littlebeck, North Yorkshire